Julian Jakob Baumgartlinger (born 2 January 1988) is an Austrian professional footballer who plays as a midfielder for German  club FC Augsburg and the Austria national team.

Career
Growing up in the Austrian market town of Mattsee, Baumgartlinger began playing football at local USC Mattsee at age five. In 2001, he left Austria to join the renowned youth academy of 1860 Munich. There he ran through all the youth teams and eventually was called to their first team in 2007. After having played 13 times, mostly as substitute, in the 2007–08 and 2008–09 seasons, he accepted a call from Austrian club Austria Wien to return to his homeland after eight years.

In Vienna, Baumgartlinger spent two successful years, becoming a regular for his club as well as for the Austria national team. This attracted the attention of Bundesliga team Mainz 05, which acquired his services for a transfer fee estimated at €1.1 million. On 19 May 2016, it was announced Baumgartlinger had signed a four-year contract with Bayer Leverkusen.

On 16 August 2022, Baumgartlinger joined Augsburg on a one-season contract.

International career

He represented the national team at UEFA Euro 2016, and UEFA Euro 2020.

Career statistics

Club

International

Scores and results list Austria's goal tally first, score column indicates score after each  Baumgartlinger goal.

References

External links

1988 births
Living people
Austrian footballers
Austria international footballers
Austria youth international footballers
Austria under-21 international footballers
TSV 1860 Munich players
TSV 1860 Munich II players
FK Austria Wien players
1. FSV Mainz 05 players
Bayer 04 Leverkusen players
FC Augsburg players
Austrian Football Bundesliga players
Bundesliga players
2. Bundesliga players
Footballers from Salzburg
Association football midfielders
Austrian expatriate footballers
Expatriate footballers in Germany
Austrian expatriate sportspeople in Germany
UEFA Euro 2016 players
UEFA Euro 2020 players